Dedric Ronshell Mathis (born September 26, 1973) is a former American and Canadian football defensive back in the National Football League (NFL), Arena Football League (AFL) and Canadian Football League (CFL). He played college football at Houston. Mathis was drafted by the Indianapolis Colts in the second round of the 1996 NFL Draft. He also played for the Orlando Predators of the AFL and Hamilton Tiger-Cats of the CFL.

References

External links
Just Sports Stats

1973 births
Living people
People from Cuero, Texas
Players of American football from Texas
American football cornerbacks
Houston Cougars football players
Indianapolis Colts players
Orlando Predators players
American players of Canadian football
Canadian football defensive backs
Hamilton Tiger-Cats players